The Heinkel Doppeldecker 43 was a prototype German fighter aircraft of the 1930s.  A single-engined, single-seat biplane, the HD 43 was designed to meet a secret German Reichswehr requirement for a single-seat fighter.  It had two-bay wooden wings with a steel-tube fuselage, and was powered by a 750 hp (600 kW) BMW VI engine. The single prototype flew in 1931.

It was evaluated against the Arado Ar 65, with the Arado being selected and no production of the Heinkel followed.

Specifications

References

Further reading

 

1930s German fighter aircraft
HD 43
Aircraft first flown in 1931